Iago is a genus of houndsharks in the family Triakidae. The name comes from the villain in William Shakespeare´s Othello. Also known as Iago omanensis is a small, placental viviparous shark that is found abundantly in the deep waters of the Gulf of Aqaba, Red Sea. It can be found at the depths of 150-1500 meters.

Species
Two recognized extant species are in this genus:
 I. garricki Fourmanoir & Rivaton, 1979 (longnose houndshark)
 I. omanensis Norman, 1939 (bigeye houndshark)

References
 
 Ramirez- Herrejon, JP. (2014). Long term changes in the fish fauna of Lago de Patzcuaro in Central Mexico. Retrieved from 
webofknowledge.com

 Fishelson, Lev, and Avi Baranes. “Ocular Development in the Oman shark,Iago Omanensis (Triakidae), Gulf of Aqaba, Red Sea.” The Anatomical Record., vol. 256, no. 4, publisher not identified, 1999, pp. 389–402, https://doi.org/10.1002/(SICI)1097-0185(19991201)256:4<389::AID-AR6>3.0.CO;2-L.
 Fishelson, Lev, and Avi Baranes. “Morphological and Cytological Ontogenesis of the Ampullae of Lorenzini and Lateral Line Canals in the Oman shark,Iago Omanensis Norman 1939 (Triakidae), from the Gulf of Aqaba, Red Sea.” The Anatomical Record., vol. 252, no. 4, publisher not identified, 1998, pp. 532–45, https://doi.org/10.1002/(SICI)1097-0185(199812)252:4<532::AID-AR4>3.0.CO;2-G.
 Fishelson, L., et al. “Morphogenesis of the Salt Gland in the Viviparous Oman Shark, Iago Omanensis (Triakidae) from the Gulf of Aqaba (Red Sea).” Journal of the Marine Biological Association of the United Kingdom., vol. 84, no. 2, Cambridge University Press, 2004, pp. 433–37, https://doi.org/10.1017/S0025315404009403h.

 
Shark genera
Taxa named by Leonard Compagno
Taxa named by Stewart Springer

fr:Iago